is an underground railway station on the Tokyo Metro Chiyoda Line in Bunkyo, Tokyo, Japan, operated by Tokyo Metro.

Lines
Sendagi Station is served by the Tokyo Metro Chiyoda Line, and is numbered C-15.

Station layout 
The station consists of two side platforms located on separate levels.

Platforms

Surrounding area 
 Dōkan-yama
 Yanaka Cemetery
 Nippon Medical School

History 
Sendagi Station opened on 20 December 1969.

The station facilities were inherited by Tokyo Metro after the privatization of the Teito Rapid Transit Authority (TRTA) in 2004.

References

External links 
 Tokyo Metro Sendagi Station 

Railway stations in Japan opened in 1969
Tokyo Metro Chiyoda Line
Stations of Tokyo Metro
Railway stations in Tokyo